Deluxe may refer to:

Corporations
 Deluxe Corporation, check printers
 De Luxe Motor Car Company, an American automobile manufacturer

Media and entertainment
 DeLuxe Color, a brand of color photography used in motion pictures, especially those made by 20th Century Fox since late 1953
 Deluxe Entertainment Services Group Inc., parent company of
 Deluxe Digital Studios
 Deluxe Laboratories
 Deluxe Music, a German music television channel
 Matsuko Deluxe
 Super Mario Bros. Deluxe, a Game Boy Color platforming game
 Mario Kart 8 Deluxe, a Nintendo Switch racing game
 New Super Mario Bros. U Deluxe, a Nintendo Switch platforming game

Music
 Deluxe (musician), a rock musician (Xoel López) from Galicia, Spain
 Deluxe (musical group), an electronic group from Aix-en-Provence, France
 Deluxe (Harmonia album), an album by Harmonia
 Deluxe (Better Than Ezra album), an album by Better Than Ezra
 De Luxe Records, a record label
 Deluxe Records, a record label
 Johnny Deluxe, a Danish music group
 Pepe Deluxé, a Finnish dance music project
 Samy Deluxe, a German rap musician
 Tim Deluxe, a British DJ and producer
 Delux, a Mexican punk/alternative rock band

See also
 DX (disambiguation)